Kévin Malcuit (born 31 July 1991) is a French professional footballer who plays for Turkish club Ankaragücü. He predominantly plays as a full-back. He is also capable of playing in a number of different positions, including as a winger and as an attacker.

Malcuit started his career with Monaco, but after finding his first-team opportunities limited and being sent out on loan to Vannes, he joined Fréjus Saint-Raphaël in the summer of 2012. Good performances in the Championnat National led to a return to professional football with Chamois Niortais in January 2014. During his time at Niort, he was named in the Ligue 2 Team of the Season for 2014–15. He played more than 40 matches in all competitions for the club during an 18-month spell before transferring to Saint-Étienne in August 2015.

Club career

Early career
Malcuit was born in Châtenay-Malabry, a suburb of Paris. As a youth he represented Parisian side Racing Club before being scouted by Monaco at the age of 17. At Monaco, he began his senior career, breaking into the professional setup towards the end of the 2009–10 season. He was first included in the match-day squad for the Ligue 1 game against Lorient on 5 May 2010, although he was an unused substitute. He eventually made his debut early the following season, coming on as a late substitute for Vincent Muratori in the 0–0 draw with Toulouse on 18 September 2010. This proved to be his only senior appearance of the campaign, although he was a regular for the reserve side, making 28 appearances in the Championnat de France amateur.

After making four first-team appearances for Monaco during the first half of the 2011–12 season, two of them in the league, Malcuit was loaned to Championnat National side Vannes in January 2012 for the remainder of the season. He made his debut as a substitute for Mohamed Youssouf in the goalless draw with Chamois Niortais on 17 February 2012. Malcuit scored his first senior goal in the 2–2 draw away at Orléans on 1 March 2012. In total, he played 12 times for Vannes during his loan spell, scoring twice. Malcuit was released by Monaco in the summer of 2012 and subsequently returned to the Championnat National, signing for Fréjus Saint-Raphaël on a free transfer following a successful trial period. He went on to spend one-and-a-half seasons with the Varois club, making 38 league appearances and scoring two goals.

Niort
On 9 January 2014, it was announced that Ligue 2 side Chamois Niortais had signed Malcuit on an 18-month contract after agreeing a fee with Fréjus. He did not break into the first team immediately upon his arrival at Niort, and had to wait until 18 April 2014 to make his debut for the club, when he replaced Tristan Lahaye late in a 1–2 home defeat to Brest at the Stade René Gaillard. He went on to play in each of the final six matches of the season, two of them from a starting berth. During the 2014–15 campaign, Malcuit found himself a regular in the first team under new manager Régis Brouard, starting 28 of the club's 38 league fixtures that season. He was often utilised in a midfield role, preferred on the right wing to loan signing Adama Ba. Malcuit scored two goals during the 2014–15 season, including one in a 1–3 away win at Valenciennes on 20 February 2015. His performances led to him being named the best outfield player in Ligue 2 in 2014–15 by France Football magazine. He was also selected in the Ligue 2 Team of the Season alongside teammates Paul Delecroix and Florian Martin.

Despite links with a number of Ligue 1 clubs during the summer of 2015, including Nice and Bordeaux, Malcuit remained at Niort and featured in the opening four matches of the 2015–16 campaign.

Saint-Étienne
On 28 August 2015, Malcuit joined Saint-Étienne on a four-year contract, for a reported transfer fee of €800,000.

Lille
Malcuit signed a five-year contract with Ligue 1 rivals Lille on 8 July 2017, after being signed by Head Coach Marcelo Bielsa.

Napoli
On 8 August 2018, Malcuit signed to Italian Serie A side Napoli. The transfer fee paid to Lille was reported as €11 million plus possible bonuses.

Fiorentina
On 28 January 2021, Malcuit joined Fiorentina on loan until 30 June 2021.

Ankaragücü
On 8 September 2022, Malcuit signed a one-year contract with Süper Lig club Ankaragücü. He made his debut for the club on 18 September, coming on as a late substitute for Oğuz Ceylan in a 2–1 league win over Sivasspor.

International career
Malcuit was called up to the Morocco national team in 2016. 
In October 2019, Malcuit had rejected the opportunity to play for Morocco internationally and that he harboured an ambition of playing for France.

Personal life
Malcuit was born in France to a Mauritanian father and Moroccan mother. His brother Samir is also a professional footballer.

Career statistics

References

External links
 
 
 

1991 births
Footballers from Hauts-de-Seine
Living people
People from Châtenay-Malabry
French footballers
French sportspeople of Moroccan descent
French sportspeople of Mauritanian descent
Association football defenders
AS Monaco FC players
Vannes OC players
ÉFC Fréjus Saint-Raphaël players
Chamois Niortais F.C. players
AS Saint-Étienne players
Lille OSC players
S.S.C. Napoli players
ACF Fiorentina players
MKE Ankaragücü footballers
Ligue 1 players
Ligue 2 players
Championnat National players
Serie A players
Süper Lig players
French expatriate footballers
French expatriate sportspeople in Italy
Expatriate footballers in Italy
French expatriate sportspeople in Turkey
Expatriate footballers in Turkey